Ahmed Khairy (born 15 September 1994) is an Egyptian handball player for CS Dinamo București and the Egyptian national team.

He participated at the 2017 and 2019 World Men's Handball Championships.

Honours 
Egyptian Cup
 Winner: 2018–19, 2019–20 (with Al Alhy)
 Romanian League
 Winner: 2022 (with Dinamo București)

References

1994 births
Living people
Egyptian male handball players
21st-century Egyptian people